Ajgana Union is a union of Mirzapur Upazila, Tangail District, Bangladesh.

Demographics
According to the 2011 Bangladesh census, Ajgana Union had 7,463 households and a population of 32,949. The literacy rate (age 7 and over) was 51.2% (male: 54.5%, female: 48%).

See also
 Union Councils of Tangail District

References

Populated places in Tangail District
Unions of Mirzapur Upazila